The Captain is a 1971 West German comedy film directed by Kurt Hoffmann and starring Heinz Rühmann, Johanna Matz and Horst Tappert. The captain of an old tramp steamer is offered the chance to take over a luxury cruise ship.

The film is based upon the 1954 novel The Captain's Table by Richard Gordon. It is a remake of the British film The Captain's Table (1959). The film's sets were designed by the art directors Isabella Schlichting and Werner Schlichting. It was made at the Bavaria Studios in Munich and on location in Kiel.

Cast
 Heinz Rühmann  as Wilhelm Ebbs
  Johanna Matz as Claudia Lund
 Horst Tappert as Konsul Carstens
  Ernst Stankovski as Meier-Pollex
  Horst Janson as Jörg Neher
  Monika Lundi as Anette Breitenbach
  Hans Korte as Prittel
  Joseph Offenbach as Otto Krümel
  Günter Pfitzmann as Oldenburg
  Teri Tordai as Ilona Porter-Almassy
  Ruedi Walter as Friedrich Haas
  Margrit Rainer as Frau Haas
  Carl Lange as Victor Anderson
 Jane Hempel  as Evelyn Moll

References

Bibliography
 Bock, Hans-Michael & Bergfelder, Tim. The Concise CineGraph. Encyclopedia of German Cinema. Berghahn Books, 2009.

External links

1971 films
West German films
1971 comedy films
1970s German-language films
Films directed by Kurt Hoffmann
German comedy films
Seafaring films
Films based on British novels
Remakes of British films
Constantin Film films
Films shot at Bavaria Studios
1970s German films